Holloway v Attorney-General [1994] 2 ERNZ 528 is a case frequently cited in New Zealand regarding unilateral contracts.

Background
Until the late 1980s, in an effort to reduce a shortage of school teachers in New Zealand, the Ministry of Education stated that people who completed a teachers course at university, upon graduation, would be employed for 2 years as a teacher by the ministry.

However, with declining numbers of students, and a substantial budget deficit, the government ceased this guarantee of employment, and when Ms Hollaway graduated as a teacher she was not offered the promised employment.

Not happy with this, Holloway sued the Ministry of Education in the Employment Court.

Held
The Court of Appeal ruled that the Ministry of Education's statements of "will be appointed [as a teacher]" was a unilateral contract, thus there was a legally binding obligation to employ Ms Holloway.

Footnote: Although Holloway won the battle of whether there was a legally binding employment contract, she at the same time lost the war, as the Court of Appeal ruled that the Employment Court had no jurisdiction to hear such a case in the first place, leaving Holloway having to refile her claim via the District Court instead.

References

Court of Appeal of New Zealand cases
New Zealand contract case law
1994 in New Zealand law
1994 in case law